Gundolficeras is member of the Tornoceratidae, (goniatitid ammonites), from the Late Devonian named by Becker, 1995 and assigned to the Falcitornoceratinae. The type species is "Lobotornoceras" bicaniculatum.

Gundolficeras has a compressed or somewhat inflated shell that may have  ventrolateral furrows and an open or closed umbilicus at medium stages. The suture has a small ventral lobe and on either side, a narrow, asymmetric, rounded or pointed adventitious lobe and a high saddle located mid-flank.

Gundolficeras differs from its partly contemporary, but slightly older relative Falcitornoceras in the details of the suture and in sometimes having an open umbilicus.

References
Gundolficeras in GONIAT Online 6/9/12
Falcitornoceratinae Paleobio Database. 6/9/12

Late Devonian ammonites
Fossils of Morocco
Ammonites of Africa
Tornoceratidae
Goniatitida genera